Thomas Paul Allen (born ) is an English comedian, actor, writer and presenter. In 2005, Allen won the So You Think You're Funny contest.

Early life and education
Allen attended Coopers School in Chislehurst. He trained with the National Youth Theatre, performing with the company in London and Manchester, in addition to working on outreach projects, films and also forming part of their Company Management Team.

Career

Comedian
In 2005, at the age of 22, Allen won the UK comedy newcomer award, So You Think You're Funny. The same year, he won the BBC New Comedy Award. In 2016, he supported Sarah Millican on her sold-out tour of Australia, New Zealand and the UK. He has also supported Josh Widdicombe, Romesh Ranganathan and Michael McIntyre.

After a sell-out run of his show Indeed at the Edinburgh Festival in 2016, he returned to The Pleasance in Edinburgh the following year with his show Absolutely. Allen subsequently embarked on his first solo tour around the UK in September 2017, and extended the tour into 2018, including two London runs at the Soho Theatre.

Film
Allen's film work includes Colour Me Kubrick with John Malkovich, Starter for Ten with James McAvoy and Mark Gatiss and Tamara Drewe.

Television
For the BBC, he has appeared in the series Sensitive Skin and The Cut, as well as biopics of Fanny Cradock (Fear of Fanny) and Frankie Howerd (Rather You Than Me). In 2008, Allen made his own documentary about identity for E4, titled Who Is Tom Allen?.
In 2009, Allen appeared on Channel 4's weekly TNT Show, writing and presenting Dictionary Corner. He also appeared on Law of the Playground for the same broadcaster.
In August 2015 and March 2016, Allen appeared on 8 Out of 10 Cats Does Countdown as a Dictionary Corner guest. In October 2016, he appeared as a guest on BBC2's The Great British Bake Off: An Extra Slice, and in January 2017, he made his debut on Live at the Apollo in an episode hosted by Sarah Millican. The following month, he appeared as a panellist on the CBBC show The Dog Ate My Homework. In July 2017, he appeared on a celebrity special version of gameshow The Crystal Maze and – an hour later the same night – on Mock the Week.

He has also appeared on Big Brother's Big Mouth and Big Brother's Little Brother.

In 2018, Allen appeared on the BBC One comedy quiz show Ready or Not. He hosted Bake Off: The Professionals with former contestant from The Great British Bake Off Liam Charles, but left before season 5 where he was replaced by Stacey Solomon. He joined the 2018 series of The Great British Bake Off: An Extra Slice as a regular contributor.

In 2019, it was announced that he would become the new host from Series 15 of The Apprentice: You're Fired!, taking over from Rhod Gilbert. Allen also appeared in an episode of Josh Widdicombe's show Hypothetical.

2020 saw Allen compete on Richard Osman's House of Games, alongside Chizzy Akudolu, Charlie Higson, and Kate Williams. He also made two appearances on QI in the same year, and appeared again on Hypothetical.

In December 2020, Allen co hosted The Great Christmas Bake Off alongside Matt Lucas as a replacement for Noel Fielding due to his paternity leave following the birth of his second child.

On 20 February 2021, Allen appeared as a contestant on the ITV game show Celebrity Catchphrase. On 11 April 2021, Allen appeared as a contestant on the ITV quiz show Tipping Point.

Also in 2021, Allen presented Tom Allen's Quizness for Channel 4 (a five-part series, first shown on 14 May 2021) and was signed up to present ITV/Marks & Spencer's Cooking with the Stars, a competitive cookery show which aired its first episode on Tuesday 13 July.

In late 2021, Allen was signed up to be the host of the first National Comedy Awards, a new annual awards ceremony which Channel 4 hopes will be the successor to the British Comedy Awards. Allen was going to present the awards at the London Roundhouse on 15 December 2021 (with a Channel 4 transmission date of 17 December 2021), but the first ceremony was postponed by the channel a week before it was due to be staged, due to the concerns over the Omicron variant of Covid 19. On 8 December 2021, Channel 4 said that event will be rescheduled for another time, though they did not give an indication to what date it would be or whether Allen would still be the host.

Radio 
Allen has co-written and recorded two series of The Correspondent for BBC Radio 4. In 2009, he made guest appearances on Loose Ends and The Richard Bacon Show.

He took the lead role of young Pip Bin in the BBC Radio 4 comedy Bleak Expectations, which has so far run to five series (2007, 2008, 2009, 2010 and 2012), co-starring with Anthony Stewart Head and Richard Johnson.

In 2008, he recorded a radio adaptation of The Wooden Overcoat with Julia Davis and David Tennant, written by Mark Gatiss.

Allen has also guested as a panellist on BBC Radio 4's Just a Minute, in August 2015 and February 2017. He was also a guest presenter on the 9th episode of the 86th series broadcast in April 2021.

In 2018, as part of a series of comedy stand-up specials on BBC Radio 4, a programme titled Tom Allen Is Actually Not Very Nice was broadcast on 22 April. The show was then extended to a series with four episodes broadcast in December 2019.

Doctor Who audio
Allen portrayed Oliver Harper, the travelling companion of the First Doctor and Steven Taylor during a limited three-story arc in the Big Finish Productions audio dramas based on the Doctor Who series, released in 2011. His character is a city trader from 1966, who joined the First Doctor and Taylor in the audio plays The Perpetual Bond, The Cold Equations and The First Wave. Harper was the first ongoing companion created for the Companion Chronicles range.

Podcast
Since October 2015, Allen has co-hosted the podcast Like Minded Friends with comedian Suzi Ruffell. He also guested on Ruffell's other podcast, Out with Suzi Ruffell.

Awards and nominations

 So You Think You're Funny (2005)
 BBC New Comedy Award (2005)

Personal life
He lived with his parents from his birth until May 2021. His father died on 1 December 2021, aged 80. In 2022 Allen appeared alongside fellow comedian, Joel Dommett, in an episode of DNA Journey tracing his roots from Sydenham in South London back to County Donegal in Ireland.

References

External links
 
 Official website
Chortle Page

Allen, Tom (comedian)
Allen, Tom (comedian)
Allen, Tom (comedian)
Allen, Tom (comedian)
Allen, Tom (comedian)
Allen, Tom (comedian)
Allen, Tom (comedian)
Allen, Tom (comedian)
Allen, Tom (comedian)
Allen, Tom (comedian)
Allen, Tom (comedian)
Allen, Tom (comedian)
Allen, Tom (comedian)
Allen, Tom (comedian)